Río Cuilco is a river in Guatemala. The river's sources are located in the Sierra Madre just north of Cajolá where it is called Río Blanco. The Río Blanco joins the Las Manzanas River which in turn joins the San Isidro River to form the Cuilco river.

References

External links
Map of Guatemala including the river

Rivers of Guatemala
Rivers of Mexico
Geography of Mesoamerica
International rivers of North America
Grijalva River